Whitehorn or Whitehorne may refer to:

Places
Whitehorn, Calgary, a neighbourhood in Calgary, Alberta, Canada
Whitehorn Mountain, Alberta, Canada
Whitehorn Mountain (British Columbia), peak in eastern British Columbia, Canada

Other
Whitehorn (surname), includes a list of people with the surnames Whitehorn and Whitehorne
Whitehorn or Finnbhennach, stud bull owned by king Ailill of Connacht in Irish mythology
Whitehorn Public School, elementary school in Peel District School Board in Mississauga, Ontario, Canada
Whitehorn station, light rail station in Calgary, Canada
Whitehorne House Museum, house museum in Newport, Rhode Island, U.S.
144907 Whitehorne, minor planet

See also